Uyyakondaravi (also spelled as Uyyakondan Ravi; population c. 500) is a village in Tamil Nadu state, India, near Neyveli. The latter is a township popular for its mining and electrical power industries.

References

Villages in Cuddalore district